Thaon-les-Vosges is a former commune in the Vosges department in northeastern France. On 1 January 2016, it was merged into the new commune Capavenir Vosges, which was renamed Thaon-les-Vosges effective 2022.

See also
Communes of the Vosges department

References

External links

Official site

Former communes of Vosges (department)